is a Japanese Tokusatsu drama and the 40th entry of Toei's long-running Super Sentai metaseries, following Shuriken Sentai Ninninger. Zyuohger premiered February 14, 2016, joining Kamen Rider Ghost, and later, Kamen Rider Ex-Aid in the Super Hero Time line-up on TV Asahi affiliate stations, until its conclusion on February 5, 2017. Released as part of Super Sentai's 40th anniversary and Toei's "Super Hero Year", Zyuohger is the sixth series in the franchise whose central theme is animals, after Taiyo Sentai Sun Vulcan, Choujyu Sentai Liveman, Chōjin Sentai Jetman, Seijuu Sentai Gingaman, and Hyakujuu Sentai Gaoranger. The series also has a Minecraft-inspired and Rubik's cube motif. The lead screenwriter for the series is Junko Kōmura.

The cast and characters were revealed at an event at Tokyo Dome City on January 23 and 24, 2016, while the characters had their official debut in the film Shuriken Sentai Ninninger vs. ToQger the Movie: Ninja in Wonderland.

Zyuohger began airing in South Korea as Power Rangers Animal Force.

Story

Four of the Zyumen – the shark woman Sela, the lion man Leo, the elephant man Tusk, and the white tiger woman Amu – try to defend Zyuland from the Dethgaliens but their fight takes them to Earth, with Yamato in tow, and it is revealed that he possesses an artifact known as the Champion's Proof, the fifth of a set also possessed by his Zyuman companions. The Champion's Proofs transform into devices that allow the five of them to transform into the Zyuohgers and fight the Dethgalien general attacking the Earth. After the fight, the Zyumen realize that they are now trapped in the human world, as there needs to be six Champion's Proofs for them to return to Zyuland. Yamato helps the four Zyumen live in the human world while they search for the sixth Champion's Proof, all the while continuing to battle the Dethgaliens who have added the Zyuohgers to their Blood Game festivities, which become even more intense when the invaders kidnap the human Misao Mondo and transform him into an artificial Zyuohger to fight in their stead. However, once the Zyuohgers release Misao from the Dethgaliens' control, he joins their side as Zyuoh The World, while Bud, an old acquaintance of Yamato's family, later uses the sixth and final Champion's Proof to join the fight as Zyuoh Bird.

Episodes

Production
The trademark for the series was filed by Toei Company on September 7, 2015.

Films
The Zyuohgers made their debut appearance in Shuriken Sentai Ninninger vs. ToQger the Movie: Ninja in Wonderland, released in Japanese theaters on January 23, 2016.

The Exciting Circus Panic!

 was released in Japanese theaters on August 6, 2016, double-billed with the film for Kamen Rider Ghost. The event of the movie takes place between Episode 22 and 23.

Zyuohger vs. Ninninger

, is a feature film featuring a crossover between Zyuohger and Shuriken Sentai Ninninger, released on January 14, 2017. The event of the movie takes place between Episode 38 and 39.

Ultra Super Hero Taisen
A crossover film, titled  featuring the casts of Kamen Rider Ex-Aid, Amazon Riders, Uchu Sentai Kyuranger, and Doubutsu Sentai Zyuohger, was released in Japan on March 25, 2017. This movie also celebrates the 10th anniversary of Kamen Rider Den-O and features the spaceship Andor Genesis from the Xevious game, which is used by the movie's main antagonists, as well as introduces the movie-exclusive Kamen Rider True Brave, played by Kamen Rider Brave's actor Toshiki Seto from Kamen Rider Ex-Aid, and the villain Shocker Great Leader III, played by the singer Diamond Yukai. In addition, individual actors from older Kamen Rider and Super Sentai TV series, Ryohei Odai (Kamen Rider Ryuki), Gaku Matsumoto (Shuriken Sentai Ninninger), Atsushi Maruyama (Zyuden Sentai Kyoryuger), and Hiroya Matsumoto (Tokumei Sentai Go-Busters) reprise their respective roles.

Super Doubutsu Taisen
 is included as part of the Blu-ray Miniseries releases of Doubutsu Sentai Zyuohger. It comprises four episodes, featuring characters from previous Super Sentai series, as part of the celebration of the 40th anniversary of the franchise. The event of the special takes place between Episode 29 and 30.

V-Cinema

Give Me Your Life! Earth Champion Tournament
 is a direct-to-video film released on June 28, 2017. Original characters (Dethgalien executives and Perle) are set to return in addition to new casts, such as rakugoka Hayashiya Taihei as Pocane Daniro and Rie Kugimiya as Lilian. The film also features the movie-exclusive Zyuoh Condor, and the events of the movie take place after the final episode of the series.

Lupinranger VS Patranger VS Kyuranger

 is a V-Cinema release that features a crossover between Uchu Sentai Kyuranger and Kaitou Sentai Lupinranger VS Keisatsu Sentai Patranger, also including Naoki Kunishima from Zyuohger reprising his role. It was released on DVD and Blu-ray on August 21, 2019.

Cast
: 
: 
: 
: 
: 
: 
,: 
:

Voice actors
: 
: 
: 
: 
: 
: 
: 
: 
: 
: 
: 
Narration, Zyuohger Equipment Voice:

Guest cast

: 
: 
: 
: 
: 
: 
: 
: 
: 
: 
: 
: 
Mobilate Voice (28, 29): 
Boy (38): 
: 
: 
Reporter (43):

Songs
Opening theme

Lyrics: 
Composition: Hideaki Takatori
Arrangement:  (Project.R)
Artist:  (Project.R)
Instruments: 
Chorus: 
Ending themes

Lyrics: Shoko Fujibayashi
Composition & Arrangement:  (Project.R)
Artist:  (Project.R)
Chorus: Young Fresh
Episodes: 1-27, 30-47

Lyrics: Shoko Fujibayashi, 
Composition & Arrangement:  (Project.R)
Artist: Project.R
Instruments: Zetki
Episodes: 28, 29

Lyrics: Shoko Fujibayashi
Composition & Arrangement: Takayoshi Tanimoto (Project.R)
Artist: Yohei Onishi (Project.R)
Chorus: Young Fresh
Episodes: 48

Notes

References

External links
 at TV Asahi
 at Toei Company
 at Super-Sentai.net

Super Sentai
2016 Japanese television series debuts
2017 Japanese television series endings
Television series about alien visitations
Works about animals
Television series about animals